The Authentic Croatian Peasant Party, or, translated more literally, the Autochthonous Croatian Peasant Party, is a centre-right political party in Croatia.

History

Authentic Croatian Peasant Party was founded in Zagreb on 14 March 2007. First party president was Jasenko Stipac.

The party refers to the tradition of Stjepan Radić's HPSS.

According to the Party's statute, "it is in particular committed to the promotion of the interests of farmers, workers, and intelligence of the Croatian nation". Party's values are "honesty, faith, family, patriotism and labor."

Ahead of the 2015 parliamentary election the party joined the ruling centre to centre-left Kukuriku coalition led by the Social Democratic Party of Croatia.

Electoral results

General elections

European Parliament

References

External links

Agrarian parties
Centrist parties in Croatia
Political parties established in 2007
2007 establishments in Croatia